This is a list of award winners and league leaders for the Kansas City Royals professional baseball team.

Regular-season awards

MVP Award
 1980: George Brett

Cy Young Award
 1985: Bret Saberhagen
 1989: Bret Saberhagen
 1994: David Cone
 2009: Zack Greinke

Rookie of the Year
1969: Lou Piniella
1994: Bob Hamelin
1999: Carlos Beltrán
2003: Ángel Berroa

Comeback Player of the Year
2017: Mike Moustakas
2020: Salvador Pérez

Silver Slugger Award
1980: George Brett and Willie Wilson
1982: Hal McRae and Willie Wilson
1985: George Brett
1986: Frank White
1988: George Brett
1995: Gary Gaetti
1998: Dean Palmer
2012: Billy Butler
2015: Kendrys Morales
2016: Salvador Pérez
2017: Eric Hosmer
2018: Salvador Pérez
2020: Salvador Pérez
2021: Salvador Pérez

Rawlings Gold Glove Award
1971: Amos Otis
1973: Amos Otis
1974: Amos Otis
1977: Frank White and Al Cowens
1978: Frank White
1979: Frank White
1980: Frank White and Willie Wilson
1981: Frank White
1982: Frank White
1985: George Brett
1986: Frank White
1987: Frank White
1989: Bret Saberhagen and Bob Boone
2000: Jermaine Dye
2006: Mark Grudzielanek
2011: Alex Gordon
2012: Alex Gordon
2013: Salvador Pérez, Eric Hosmer, and Alex Gordon
2014: Salvador Pérez, Eric Hosmer, and Alex Gordon (Gordon-Rawlings Platinum Glove Award Winner)
2015: Salvador Pérez, Eric Hosmer, and Alcides Escobar
2016: Salvador Pérez
2017: Alex Gordon
2018: Alex Gordon and Salvador Pérez
2019: Alex Gordon
2020: Alex Gordon (Gordon-Rawlings Platinum Gold Glove Award Winner)
2021: Andrew Bennintendi and Michael A. Taylor

Edgar Martínez Award
1976: Hal McRae
1980: Hal McRae
1982: Hal McRae
2012: Billy Butler
2015: Kendrys Morales

Wilson Defensive Player of the Year Award

See explanatory note at Atlanta Braves.
Team (at all positions)
 (2012)
 (2013)

Left field (in MLB)
Alex Gordon (2014)

Centerfield (in MLB)
Lorenzo Cain (2014)

USA Today AL Top Rookie
Eric Hosmer (2011)

Rolaids Relief Man of the Year
See footnote
Dan Quisenberry has won more Relief Man of the Year awards than any other player in baseball history.
1980: Dan Quisenberry
1982: Dan Quisenberry
1983: Dan Quisenberry
1984: Dan Quisenberry
1993: Jeff Montgomery

MLB "This Year in Baseball Awards"

Note: These awards are voted on by five groups for all of Major League Baseball (i.e., not one per league).
Note: These awards were renamed the "GIBBY Awards" (Greatness in Baseball Yearly) in 2010 and then the "Esurance MLB Awards" in 2015.

"Esurance MLB Awards" Best Major Leaguer, Postseason
 –  Wade Davis

MLB "GIBBY Awards" Best Closer
 – Greg Holland

MLB "GIBBY Awards" Best Setup Man
2014 – Wade Davis

MLB "GIBBY Awards" Best Executive
2014 – Dayton Moore
2015 – Dayton Moore

Baseball America All-Rookie Team
See: Baseball America#Baseball America All-Rookie Team
2011 – Eric Hosmer (1B)

Topps All-Star Rookie teams

Manager of the Year
2003: Tony Peña

Postseason and all-star game awards

World Series MVP
1985: Bret Saberhagen
2015: Salvador Pérez

American League Championship Series MVP
1980: Frank White
1985: George Brett
2014: Lorenzo Cain
2015: Alcides Escobar

All-Star Game MVP
1989: Bo Jackson
2016: Eric Hosmer

Team award
1980 – William Harridge Trophy (American League championship)
1985
 – Commissioner's Trophy (World Series championship)
 – Baseball America Organization of the Year
2014
 – Baseball America Organization of the Year
2015
2015

Other achievements

Baseball Hall of Fame
See: Kansas City Royals#Baseball Hall of Famers

DHL Hometown Heroes (2006)
George Brett — voted by MLB fans as the most outstanding player in the history of the franchise, based on on-field performance, leadership quality and character value

Ford C. Frick Award recipients
See: Kansas City Royals#Ford C. Frick Award recipients

Royals Hall of Fame
See: Kansas City Royals#Hall of Fame

Retired numbers
See: Kansas City Royals#Retired numbers
5 - George Brett; 10 - Dick Howser; 20 - Frank White; 
42 - Jackie Robinson * ( retired across all of MLB) <kcroyals.com>

Sporting News Sportsman of the Year
See: Sporting News#Sportsman of the Year

Missouri Sports Hall of Fame
See: Kansas City Royals#Missouri Sports Hall of Fame

Kansas City Sports Walk of Stars
See: Barney Allis Plaza
George Brett

Season leaders

Batting champions
George Brett is the only person in baseball history to win a batting title in three different decades.

1976: George Brett (.333)
1980: George Brett (.390)
1982: Willie Wilson (.332)
1990: George Brett (.329)

RBI
1982: Hal McRae

Wins (pitcher)
1977: Dennis Leonard
1989: Bret Saberhagen

ERA
1989: Bret Saberhagen
1993: Kevin Appier

See also
Baseball awards
List of MLB awards

Footnotes

Major League Baseball team trophies and awards
Awa